Physical geography (also known as physiography) is one of the three main branches of geography. Physical geography is the branch of natural science which deals with the processes and patterns in the natural environment such as the atmosphere, hydrosphere, biosphere, and geosphere. This focus is in contrast with the branch of human geography, which focuses on the built environment, and technical geography, which focuses on using, studying, and creating tools to obtain,analyze, interpret, and understand spatial information. The three branches have significant overlap, however.

Sub-branches 

Physical geography can be divided into several branches or related fields, as follows:

 Geomorphology is concerned with understanding the surface of the Earth and the processes by which it is shaped, both at the present as well as in the past.  Geomorphology as a field has several sub-fields that deal with the specific landforms of various environments e.g. desert geomorphology and fluvial geomorphology; however, these sub-fields are united by the core processes which cause them, mainly tectonic or climatic processes.  Geomorphology seeks to understand landform history and dynamics, and predict future changes through a combination of field observation, physical experiment, and numerical modeling (Geomorphometry).  Early studies in geomorphology are the foundation for pedology, one of two main branches of soil science.

 Hydrology is predominantly concerned with the amounts and quality of water moving and accumulating on the land surface and in the soils and rocks near the surface and is typified by the hydrological cycle. Thus the field encompasses water in rivers, lakes, aquifers and to an extent glaciers, in which the field examines the process and dynamics involved in these bodies of water. Hydrology has historically had an important connection with engineering and has thus developed a largely quantitative method in its research; however, it does have an earth science side that embraces the systems approach. Similar to most fields of physical geography it has sub-fields that examine the specific bodies of water or their interaction with other spheres e.g. limnology and ecohydrology.
Glaciology is the study of glaciers and ice sheets, or more commonly the cryosphere or ice and phenomena that involve ice. Glaciology groups the latter (ice sheets) as continental glaciers and the former (glaciers) as alpine glaciers. Although research in the areas is similar to research undertaken into both the dynamics of ice sheets and glaciers, the former tends to be concerned with the interaction of ice sheets with the present climate and the latter with the impact of glaciers on the landscape. Glaciology also has a vast array of sub-fields examining the factors and processes involved in ice sheets and glaciers e.g. snow hydrology and glacial geology.
 Biogeography is the science which deals with geographic patterns of species distribution and the processes that result in these patterns. Biogeography emerged as a field of study as a result of the work of Alfred Russel Wallace, although the field prior to the late twentieth century had largely been viewed as historic in its outlook and descriptive in its approach. The main stimulus for the field since its founding has been that of evolution, plate tectonics and the theory of island biogeography. The field can largely be divided into five sub-fields: island biogeography, paleobiogeography, phylogeography, zoogeography and phytogeography.
 Climatology is the study of the climate, scientifically defined as weather conditions averaged over a long period of time. Climatology examines both the nature of micro (local) and macro (global) climates and the natural and anthropogenic influences on them. The field is also sub-divided largely into the climates of various regions and the study of specific phenomena or time periods e.g. tropical cyclone rainfall climatology and paleoclimatology.
 Soil geography deals with the distribution of soils across the terrain. This discipline, between geography and soil science, is fundamental to both physical geography and pedology. Pedology is the study of soils in their natural environment. It deals with pedogenesis, soil morphology, soil classification. Soil geography studies the spatial distribution of soils as it relates to topography, climate (water, air, temperature), soil life (micro-organisms, plants, animals) and mineral materials within soils (biogeochemical cycles).
 Palaeogeography is a cross-disciplinary study that examines the preserved material in the stratigraphic record to determine the distribution of the continents through geologic time.  Almost all the evidence for the positions of the continents comes from geology in the form of fossils or paleomagnetism.  The use of these data has resulted in evidence for continental drift, plate tectonics, and supercontinents.  This, in turn, has supported palaeogeographic theories such as the Wilson cycle.
 Coastal geography is the study of the dynamic interface between the ocean and the land, incorporating both the physical geography (i.e. coastal geomorphology, geology, and oceanography) and the human geography of the coast. It involves an understanding of coastal weathering processes, particularly wave action, sediment movement and weathering, and also the ways in which humans interact with the coast. Coastal geography, although predominantly geomorphological in its research, is not just concerned with coastal landforms, but also the causes and influences of sea level change.
 Oceanography is the branch of physical geography that studies the Earth's oceans and seas. It covers a wide range of topics, including marine organisms and ecosystem dynamics (biological oceanography); ocean currents, waves, and geophysical fluid dynamics (physical oceanography); plate tectonics and the geology of the sea floor (geological oceanography); and fluxes of various chemical substances and physical properties within the ocean and across its boundaries (chemical oceanography). These diverse topics reflect multiple disciplines that oceanographers blend to further knowledge of the world ocean and understanding of processes within it.
 Quaternary science is an interdisciplinary field of study focusing on the Quaternary period, which encompasses the last 2.6 million years. The field studies the last ice age and the recent interstadial the Holocene and uses proxy evidence to reconstruct the past environments during this period to infer the climatic and environmental changes that have occurred.
 Landscape ecology is a sub-discipline of ecology and geography that address how spatial variation in the landscape affects ecological processes such as the distribution and flow of energy, materials, and individuals in the environment (which, in turn, may influence the distribution of landscape "elements" themselves such as hedgerows). The field was largely funded by the German geographer Carl Troll. Landscape ecology typically deals with problems in an applied and holistic context. The main difference between biogeography and landscape ecology is that the latter is concerned with how flows or energy and material are changed and their impacts on the landscape whereas the former is concerned with the spatial patterns of species and chemical cycles.
 Geomatics is the field of gathering, storing, processing, and delivering geographic information, or spatially referenced information.  Geomatics includes geodesy (scientific discipline that deals with the measurement and representation of the earth, its gravitational field, and other geodynamic phenomena, such as crustal motion, oceanic tides, and polar motion), cartography, geographical information science (GIS) and remote sensing (the short or large-scale acquisition of information of an object or phenomenon, by the use of either recording or real-time sensing devices that are not in physical or intimate contact with the object).
 Environmental geography is a branch of geography that analyzes the spatial aspects of interactions between humans and the natural world. The branch bridges the divide between human and physical geography and thus requires an understanding of the dynamics of geology, meteorology, hydrology, biogeography, and geomorphology, as well as the ways in which human societies conceptualize the environment. Although the branch was previously more visible in research than at present with theories such as environmental determinism linking society with the environment. It has largely become the domain of the study of environmental management or anthropogenic influences.

Journals and literature
Mental geography and earth science journals communicate and document the results of research carried out in universities and various other research institutions. Most journals cover a specific publish the research within that field, however unlike human geographers, physical geographers tend to publish in inter-disciplinary journals rather than predominantly geography journal; the research is normally expressed in the form of a scientific paper. Additionally, textbooks, books, and communicate research to laypeople, although these tend to focus on environmental issues or cultural dilemmas. Examples of journals that publish articles from physical geographers are:
{{div col|content=
 Earth Surface Processes and Landforms
 Journal of Biogeography
 Journal of Quaternary Science
 Journal of Coastal Research
 Geomorphology
 Palaeogeography, Palaeoclimatology, Palaeoecology
 Polar Research
 The Professional Geographer
 Natural Hazards and Earth System Sciences
 Soil Science
 Climatic Change
 Journal of Glaciology
 Earth Interactions
 Journal of Climate
 Remote Sensing of Environment
 Journal of Geocryology
 Progress in Physical Geography
 Landscape Ecology
 Transactions of the Institute of British Geographers
 Journal of Hydrology
 Sedimentology
 Bulletin of the American Meteorological Society
 Geophysical Research Letters
 Journal of Hydrometeorology
 Nature
 Journal of Geography and Geology}}

Historical evolution of the discipline
From the birth of geography as a science during the Greek classical period and until the late nineteenth century with the birth of anthropogeography (human geography), geography was almost exclusively a natural science: the study of location and descriptive gazetteer of all places of the known world. Several works among the best known during this long period could be cited as an example, from Strabo (Geography), Eratosthenes (Geographika) or Dionysius Periegetes (Periegesis Oiceumene) in the Ancient Age. In more modern times, these works include the Alexander von Humboldt (Kosmos) in the nineteenth century, in which geography is regarded as a physical and natural science through the work Summa de Geografía of Martín Fernández de Enciso from the early sixteenth century, which indicated for the first time the New World.

During the eighteenth and nineteenth centuries, a controversy exported from geology, between supporters of James Hutton (uniformitarianism thesis) and Georges Cuvier (catastrophism) strongly influenced the field of geography, because geography at this time was a natural science.

Two historical events during the nineteenth century had a great effect on the further development of physical geography. The first was the European colonial expansion in Asia, Africa, Australia and even America in search of raw materials required by industries during the Industrial Revolution. This fostered the creation of geography departments in the universities of the colonial powers and the birth and development of national geographical societies, thus giving rise to the process identified by Horacio Capel as the institutionalization of geography.

The exploration of Siberia is an example.  In the mid-eighteenth century, many geographers were sent to perform geographical surveys in the area of Arctic Siberia.  Among these is who is considered the patriarch of Russian geography, Mikhail Lomonosov.  In the mid-1750s Lomonosov began working in the Department of Geography, Academy of Sciences to conduct research in Siberia.  They showed the organic origin of soil and developed a comprehensive law on the movement of the ice, thereby founding a new branch of geography: glaciology.  In 1755 on his initiative was founded Moscow University where he promoted the study of geography and the training of geographers.  In 1758 he was appointed director of the Department of Geography, Academy of Sciences, a post from which would develop a working methodology for geographical survey guided by the most important long expeditions and geographical studies in Russia.

The contributions of the Russian school became more frequent through his disciples, and in the nineteenth century we have great geographers such as Vasily Dokuchaev who performed works of great importance as a "principle of comprehensive analysis of the territory" and "Russian Chernozem".  In the latter, he introduced the geographical concept of soil, as distinct from a simple geological stratum, and thus found a new geographic area of study: pedology.  Climatology also received a strong boost from the Russian school by Wladimir Köppen whose main contribution, climate classification, is still valid today.  However, this great geographer also contributed to the paleogeography through his work "The climates of the geological past" which is considered the father of paleoclimatology.  Russian geographers who made great contributions to the discipline in this period were: NM Sibirtsev, Pyotr Semyonov, K.D. Glinka, Neustrayev, among others.

The second important process is the theory of evolution by Darwin in mid-century (which decisively influenced the work of Friedrich Ratzel, who had academic training as a zoologist and was a follower of Darwin's ideas) which meant an important impetus in the development of Biogeography.

Another major event in the late nineteenth and early twentieth centuries took place in the United States.  William Morris Davis not only made important contributions to the establishment of discipline in his country but revolutionized the field to develop cycle of erosion theory which he proposed as a paradigm for geography in general, although in actually served as a paradigm for physical geography.  His theory explained that mountains and other landforms are shaped by factors that are manifested cyclically.  He explained that the cycle begins with the lifting of the relief by geological processes (faults, volcanism, tectonic upheaval, etc.).  Factors such as rivers and runoff begin to create V-shaped valleys between the mountains (the stage called "youth").  During this first stage, the terrain is steeper and more irregular.  Over time, the currents can carve wider valleys ("maturity") and then start to wind, towering hills only ("senescence").  Finally, everything comes to what is a plain flat plain at the lowest elevation possible (called "baseline") This plain was called by Davis' "peneplain" meaning "almost plain"  Then river rejuvenation occurs and there is another mountain lift and the cycle continues.

Although Davis's theory is not entirely accurate, it was absolutely revolutionary and unique in its time and helped to modernize and create a geography subfield of geomorphology.  Its implications prompted a myriad of research in various branches of physical geography.  In the case of the Paleogeography, this theory provided a model for understanding the evolution of the landscape.  For hydrology, glaciology, and climatology as a boost investigated as studying geographic factors shape the landscape and affect the cycle.  The bulk of the work of William Morris Davis led to the development of a new branch of physical geography: Geomorphology whose contents until then did not differ from the rest of geography.  Shortly after this branch would present a major development.  Some of his disciples made significant contributions to various branches of physical geography such as Curtis Marbut and his invaluable legacy for Pedology, Mark Jefferson, Isaiah Bowman, among others.

 Notable physical geographers 

 Eratosthenes (276194 BC) who invented the discipline of geography. He made the first known reliable estimation of the Earth's size. He is considered the father of mathematical geography and geodesy.Jennifer Fandel (2006)."The Metric System".  The Creative Company. p. 4. 
 Ptolemy (c. 90c. 168), who compiled Greek and Roman knowledge to produce the book Geographia.
 Abū Rayhān Bīrūnī (9731048 AD), considered the father of geodesy.H. Mowlana (2001). "Information in the Arab World", Cooperation South Journal 1.
 Ibn Sina (Avicenna, 980–1037), who formulated the law of superposition and concept of uniformitarianism in Kitāb al-Šifāʾ (also called The Book of Healing).
 Muhammad al-Idrisi (Dreses, 1100), who drew the Tabula Rogeriana, the most accurate world map in pre-modern times.
 Piri Reis (1465c. 1554), whose Piri Reis map is the oldest surviving world map to include the Americas and possibly Antarctica
 Gerardus Mercator (1512–1594), an innovative cartographer and originator of the Mercator projection.
 Bernhardus Varenius (1622–1650), Wrote his important work "General Geography" (1650), first overview of the geography, the foundation of modern geography.
 Mikhail Lomonosov (1711–1765), father of Russian geography and founded the study of glaciology.
 Alexander von Humboldt (1769–1859), considered the father of modern geography. Published Cosmos and founded the study of biogeography.
 Arnold Henry Guyot (1807–1884), who noted the structure of glaciers and advanced the understanding of glacial motion, especially in fast ice flow.
 Louis Agassiz (1807–1873), the author of a glacial theory which disputed the notion of a steady-cooling Earth.
 Alfred Russel Wallace (1823–1913), founder of modern biogeography and the Wallace line.
 Vasily Dokuchaev (1840–1903), patriarch of Russian geography and founder of pedology.
 Wladimir Peter Köppen (1846–1940), developer of most important climate classification and founder of Paleoclimatology.
 William Morris Davis (1850–1934), father of American geography, founder of Geomorphology and developer of the geographical cycle theory.
 John Francon Williams FRGS (1854-1911), wrote his seminal work Geography of the Oceans published in 1881. 
 Walther Penck (1888–1923), proponent of the cycle of erosion and the simultaneous occurrence of uplift and denudation.
 Sir Ernest Shackleton (1874–1922), Antarctic explorer during the Heroic Age of Antarctic Exploration.
 Robert E. Horton (1875–1945), founder of modern hydrology and concepts such as infiltration capacity and overland flow.
 J Harlen Bretz (1882–1981), pioneer of research into the shaping of landscapes by catastrophic floods, most notably the Bretz (Missoula) floods.
 Luis García Sáinz (1894–1965), pioneer of physical geography in Spain.
 Willi Dansgaard (1922–2011), palaeoclimatologist and quaternary scientist, instrumental in the use of oxygen-isotope dating and co-identifier of Dansgaard-Oeschger events.
 Hans Oeschger (1927–1998), palaeoclimatologist and pioneer in ice core research, co-identifier of Dansgaard-Orschger events.
 Richard Chorley (1927–2002), a key contributor to the quantitative revolution and the use of systems theory in geography.
 Sir Nicholas Shackleton (1937–2006), who demonstrated that oscillations in climate over the past few million years could be correlated with variations in the orbital and positional relationship between the Earth and the Sun.

See also

Areography (geography of Mars)
Atmosphere of Earth
Concepts and Techniques in Modern Geography
Earth system science
Environmental science
Environmental studies
Geographic information science
Geographic information system
Geostatistics
Global Positioning System
Planetary science
Physiographic regions of the world
Technical geography

 References 

Further reading

 Pidwirny, Michael. (2014). Glossary of Terms for Physical Geography. Planet Earth Publishing, Kelowna, Canada. . Available on Google Play.
 Pidwirny, Michael. (2014). Understanding Physical Geography. Planet Earth Publishing, Kelowna, Canada. . Available on Google Play.
 Reynolds, Stephen J. et al. (2015). Exploring Physical Geography.'' [A Visual Textbook, Featuring more than 2500 Photographies & Illustrations]. McGraw-Hill Education, New York.

External links
Physiography by T.X. Huxley, 1878, full text, physical geography of the Thames River Basin
Fundamentals of Physical Geography, 2nd Edition, by M. Pidwirny, 2006, full text
Physical Geography for Students and Teachers, UK National Grid For Learning

 
Earth sciences